Colophospermum mopane, commonly called mopane, mopani, balsam tree, butterfly tree, or turpentine tree, is a tree in the legume family (Fabaceae), that grows in hot, dry, low-lying areas,  in elevation, in the far northern parts of southern Africa. The tree only occurs in Africa and is the only species in genus Colophospermum. Its distinctive butterfly-shaped (bifoliate) leaf and thin seed pod make it easy to identify. In terms of human use it is, together with camel thorn and leadwood, one of the three regionally important firewood trees.

Range and habit

It is native to Southern Africa, including Southern Angola, Zambia, Southern Malawi, Namibia, Botswana, Zimbabwe, Mozambique and northern South Africa. It grows in alkaline (high lime content) soils which are shallow and not well drained. It also grows in alluvial soils (soil deposited by rivers). Where it occurs, it is often the dominant tree species, frequently forming homogeneous stands. Further north the trees are taller and form tall woodlands referred to as cathedral mopane. This tree does not grow well outside hot, frost-free areas with summer rainfall.

Mopane ecoregions
There are two ecoregions where mopane is the predominant vegetation. The Angolan mopane woodlands are in southwestern Angola and northern Namibia, and the Zambezian and mopane woodlands extend over the lowlands of the Zambezi River and its tributaries in Botswana, Eswatini, Namibia, Zambia, Zimbabwe, Mozambique, Malawi, and South Africa.

Uses

Mopane wood is one of southern Africa's heaviest, with a density of  when completely dry, and is difficult to work because of its hardness. However, this also makes it termite resistant. For this reason it has long been used for building houses and fences, as railway sleepers and as pit props. The termite-resistance and rich, reddish colouring also make it popular for flooring. Outside Africa, mopane is gaining popularity as a heavy, decorative wood, its uses including aquarium ornaments, bases for lamps or sculptures, and garden accents.

It is also increasingly being used in the construction of musical instruments, particularly woodwind. Suitable quality African blackwood (Dalbergia melanoxylon), traditionally used for clarinets, is becoming harder to find. Mopane is fairly oily, seasons very well with few splits or shakes, and produces instruments of a warm, rich tone. Clarinets made of mopane are offered by the manufacturers Seggelke Klarinetten, F. Arthur Uebel and Buffet Crampon.

Mopane twigs have been traditionally used as tooth brushes, bark to make twine and for tanning, and leaves for healing wounds. The wood is also used to make charcoal and for braai wood.

The tree is a major food source for the mopane worm, the caterpillar of the moth Gonimbrasia belina. The caterpillars are rich in protein and are eaten by people. The mopane worm is also rich in crude fats and contains vitamins and minerals, such as iron, calcium and phosphorus.  The tree also acts as a foodplant for a wild silk moth, Gonometa rufobrunnea. Cocoons of the moth are harvested as wild silk, to make cloth.

Mopane worm creates employment and serve as a source of income for the majority of rural women. Harvesters sell it in villages, towns or to the trader

The mopane tree also serves as a host plant for the mopane psyllid Retroacizzia mopani.

Etymology
Colophospermum is Latinised Greek for "oily seed", in reference to the resinous seed (i.e. spermum) which has a turpentine smell. Colophon was the birthplace of Homer in Ionia, and was famous for its rosin, a substance obtained from turpentine or the gummy exudate of some trees. The species name mopane is taken from the local name for the tree.

Gallery

See also
List of Southern African indigenous trees

References

 Esterhuyse, N., Von Breitenbach, J. & Söhnge, H. 2001. Remarkable trees of South Africa. Briza Publications, Pretoria.
 Ferwerda, J.G. (2005) Charting the quality of forage: measuring and mapping the variation of chemical components in foliage with hyperspectral remote sensing. Wageningen, Wageningen University, 2005. ITC Dissertation 126, 166 p. .

Flora of South Tropical Africa
Flora of Southern Africa
Trees of South Africa
Trees of Angola
Drought-tolerant trees
Tropical and subtropical dry broadleaf forests
Detarioideae